This is a list of the world's largest non-governmental privately held companies  by revenue.
This list does not include state-owned enterprises like Sinopec, State Grid, China National Petroleum, Saudi Aramco, Kuwait Petroleum Corporation, Pemex, PDVSA and others. These corporations have revenues of at least US$10 billion.

Largest private non-governmental companies by revenue

See also
List of largest companies by revenue
List of largest companies in the United States by revenue
List of largest automotive companies by revenue
List of largest private companies in the United Kingdom
List of largest manufacturing companies by revenue
List of largest corporate profits and losses
List of largest oil and gas companies by revenue
Government-owned corporation
State ownership

References

Lists of companies by revenue